Radio One FM 90 is a Uganda online radio station broadcasting from Kampala. It based on entertainment, Sports, news and music mostly provides old schools songs.

It was established in 1997.

It specialized mostly in past decades songs in urban and peri-uban English.

Notes 

1997 establishments in Uganda
Mass media in Kampala
Ugandan music
Radio stations in Uganda